1997 general election may refer to:
 1997 Canadian federal election
 1997 Irish general election
 1997 Singaporean general election
 1997 United Kingdom general election